Dayr al-Hawa was a Palestinian Arab village in the Jerusalem Subdistrict.  The village was depopulated during the 1948 Arab-Israeli War on October 19, 1948, by the Fourth Battalion of the Har'el Brigade of Operation ha-Har. It was located 18.5 km west of Jerusalem.

History
Coins and ceramics from the Byzantine era have been found here.

Ottoman era
In 1838, Edward Robinson called it a "lofty" village, on the brink of a valley. It was further noted as a Muslim village, located in the District of el-Arkub, southwest of Jerusalem.  In 1856 the village was named D. el Hawa on Kiepert's map of Palestine published that year.

Victor Guérin, visiting the village in 1863, wrote that Dayr al-Hawa "probably owes its name, monastery of the wind, to its high position". 

An Ottoman  village list from around 1870 showed that Der el-Hawa  had 32 houses and a population of 103, though the population count included men, only.

In 1883,  the PEF's Survey of Western Palestine  described it as "a village standing high, on a knoll rising from a high ridge, with a deep valley to the north. It has several high houses in it. On the west is a good spring. The ground is covered with brushwood all round the place."

In 1896 the population of  Der el-hawa  was estimated to be about 162 persons.

British Mandate era

In the 1922 census of Palestine conducted i by the British Mandate authorities,  Dair al-Hawa  had a population of  38 residents; all Muslims, increasing in  the  1931 census to 47 inhabitants, in 11 houses.  

In the 1945 statistics  the village had a population of 60 Muslims,  with  a total of  5,907   dunums of land.  Of this, 58 dunams  were for  irrigable land or plantations, 1,565  for cereals,  while 4 dunams were built-up  land.

A mosque was located in the western part of the village and there was a shrine for a local sage known as al-Shaykh Sulayman. Near the ruins of the old village now stands the Israeli moshav, Nes Harim, however, it is not on village land. (It is on the land of   Bayt 'Itab.)

During the 1948 it was defended by the local militia and the Egyptian Army/Muslim Brotherhood Battalion.

See also
Susan Abulhawa

References

Bibliography

 (p. 219)

External links
Welcome To Dayr al-Hawa
Dayr al-Hawa,  Zochrot
Survey of Western Palestine, Map 17:  IAA, Wikimedia commons 
Dayr Al-Hawa, from the Khalil Sakakini Cultural Center
Dayr al-Hawa دير الهوا, Palestine Family.net 

Arab villages depopulated during the 1948 Arab–Israeli War
District of Jerusalem